"In the Shadows" is a song by Finnish alternative rock band the Rasmus, included on the group's fifth studio album Dead Letters. Released in 2003, the single achieved considerable chart success throughout Europe and Oceania, including the United Kingdom, where it reached  3, and New Zealand, where it topped the chart. The song was nominated for the Kerrang! Award for Best Single in 2004.

Composition 
"In the Shadows" is written in the key of F minor. The chorus is based on the "millennial whoop" vocal pattern, and is considered the earliest XXI century example of this tool in popular music.  The "whoop" did exist before, but only became ubiquitous after "In the Shadows".

Music videos
There are four different music videos for the song: the Finnish (Bandit) version, the European (Crow) version, the American (Mirror) version, and a fourth, simplified version. A new version of the song, co-written by and featuring Ukrainian rap group Kalush Orchestra, is accompanied by a music video.

Finnish (Bandit) version – 2003
The video (directed by Finn Andersson for Film Magica Oy in Helsinki, Finland) shows the Rasmus performing on a stage that resembles a helipad, and are in the process of stealing from a bank when the police arrive unexpectedly. Lauri Ylönen is almost caught, but manages to grab onto the safe-door, which is being dragged behind the tow-car that the group uses for the robbery, and goes skidding down the road. He falls off and runs into the woods where police dogs find him. Drummer Aki Hakala then ushers him into the car where Lauri makes his lucky escape and the car drives off. The video was included in the soundtrack of Finnish movie Pahat pojat and footage from the film was used in the video.

European (Crow) version – 2003
The band are placed on a stage in a nondescript location and perform the song. Around the room there are crows flying around, who later break through the small rectangular windows. Towards the end, one crow breaks a light on the ceiling with its wings and the band performs in a shower of sparks. In the end, the band transforms into feathers.

The video was directed by Niklas Fronda and Fredrik Löfberg, Baranga Film in Stockholm, Sweden.

US/UK (Mirror) version – 2004
In the video, directed by Philipp Stölzl in Bucharest, Romania, the band are performing a concert in what looks to be an old Victorian mansion. During the verses, a maid (Madalina Ghitescu) is seen constantly busy serving the masters of the house in what appears to be the past of the mansion. The maid sees (lead singer) Lauri and the concert in mirrors on the walls, which causes her to become distracted, making mistakes and dropping trays. Eventually, while despairing over her errors in her room, she sees Lauri and all the fans in her mirror, while the master of the house is approaching with somebody else, possibly the head maid, presumably to reprimand the new maid. Lauri tugs her through the mirror in her room to where they are performing. She then finishes watching the concert. It concludes with the master of the house and the others entering to find the maid's room empty.

Fourth version – 2004
The Rasmus are seen performing in a plain-looking room, similar in appearance to where they perform in the "Crow" version.

Kalush Orchestra version – 2022 
The group released a new version of the song, titled "In the Shadows of Ukraine" and featuring Ukrainian rap group Kalush Orchestra. The music video for this version is directed by Leonid Kolosovskyi.

Track listings

Charts

Weekly charts

Year-end charts

Certifications

Release history

In popular culture
"In the Shadows" was released for Guitar Hero: World Tour as downloadable content. It is available as either a single track or as part of the European Track Pack 03 alongside "Break It Out" by Vanilla Sky and "C'est comme ça" by Les Rita Mitsouko. The song was also unlockable in Guitar Rock Tour.

In France, the song is used since 2006 as the title theme for TV show On n'est pas couché.

In 2004, Eddsworld creator Edd Gould featured the song in his 2004 animation "Creative Shadows".

References

External links
 The Rasmus' official website
 Lyrics

2003 singles
2003 songs
2004 singles
Island Records singles
Number-one singles in Finland
Number-one singles in Germany
Number-one singles in Hungary
Number-one singles in New Zealand
Playground Music Scandinavia singles
The Rasmus songs
Songs written by Lauri Ylönen
Universal Records singles